Mahmudabad (also Romanized as Maḥmūdābād; also known as Maḥmūdābād-e Kharmīrī and Khar Mīrī) is a village in Darmian Rural District, in the Central District of Darmian County, South Khorasan Province, Iran. At the 2006 census, its population was 62, in 14 families.

References 

Populated places in Darmian County